Yabaki is a surname. Notable people with the surname include:

Akuila Yabaki, Fijian activist and clergyman
Konisi Yabaki (died 2018), Fijian politician
Viliame Yabaki (born 1991), Fijian cricketer

See also
 Yabakei

Fijian-language surnames